Tamarack geese are model birds made from twigs, traditionally created by the Cree as decoys to be used during their spring and fall hunts.  They are made by gathering small twigs of the Tamarack (Larix laricina) tree and tying them together around a central ball, also made of Tamarack (Larix laricina) twigs using a thin brown string. While they are being made they are often held together by a thicker string which is later cut. The hole in the head of the decoy, when held against the snow, is meant to represent the white patch on the side of the head of Canada Geese 

The art of making these birds was beginning to fade, but in 1968 John Blueboy of Moose Factory, Ontario had the idea of reviving the practice by creating smaller versions to be sold as souvenirs.  Since then, many artists and artisans have picked up the art.

References

Cree culture
Decoys